Mandakuni was a region and a family of the old Armenia in southeastern Anatolia c. 300–800, of Caspio-Median or Matianian-Mannaean origin.

About 451 were rulers Pharsman Mandakuni and Sahak Mandakuni.

See also
List of regions of old Armenia

References

Mandakuni family
Early medieval Armenian regions